Jumana El Husseini, (2 April 1932 – 11 April 2018) was a Palestinian painter and sculptor who lived in Paris. She won many medals and has an extensive international exhibition record. Jumana El Husseini died in her home in Paris on 11 April 2018 at the age of 86.

She studied painting, sculpture and ceramics in Beirut and Paris. Noted for figurative paintings of Palestinian women  and geometric houses in Jerusalem and Jericho, her style evolved from realistic to geometric and, since 1987, to abstract, with wavelike overpainted drawings evoking Arabic calligraphy.

See also
 Palestinian art

References

External links
  Jumana El Husseini's website
 I am from Palestine website
 Je suis de la Palestine website
  Metropolitan Museum of Art New York

1932 births
2018 deaths
Palestinian painters
Palestinian women painters
Calligraphers of Arabic script
People from Jerusalem
Palestinian contemporary artists
Palestinian expatriates in France
Women calligraphers
20th-century calligraphers